The  is a Japanese Shinkansen high-speed train with tilting capability developed jointly by JR Central and JR West for use on the Tokaido and San'yō Shinkansen lines since 2007, and is operated by JR Kyushu on the Kyushu Shinkansen line.

Another feature of the N700 is that it accelerates more quickly than the older 700 series Shinkansen trains, with a maximum acceleration rate of 2.6 km/h/s (0.72 m/s2). This enables it to reach  in only three minutes. Further advancements led to the development of the N700A, an incremental evolution of the N700. All N700 series sets have been retrofitted with most of the improvements added to the N700A series, and are now classified as "N700A".

Because of these improvements, trains can travel between Tokyo and Osaka on a Nozomi run in as little as 2 hours and 22 minutes on the fastest service (8 minutes faster than before).

A new train, the N700S, entered service in 2020 with plans to eventually replace all N700-series trains. The first four sets began operation on 1 July 2020.

Operations
N700 series trains gradually replaced 300, 500 and 700 series sets on Nozomi services, and by the end of February 2009, the N700 series were responsible for 74 Nozomi services per day. All Nozomi through runs (over the full route between Tokyo and Hakata) were scheduled to use the N700 series exclusively by 2009. From the start of the revised timetable on 17 March 2012, all regularly scheduled Nozomi services, including runs limited only to the Tokaido Shinkansen, were operated by N700 series sets.

Since 4 March 2017, the N700 is also used on regularly scheduled Hikari services during the day, as well as all Kodama trains on the Tokaido Shinkansen, since March 2020.
Since March 2009, the N700 series trains have been equipped with wireless internet available for use between Tokyo and Shin-Osaka.

Variants
 N700 series: 81 x 16-car "Z" sets owned by JR Central, introduced from 1 July 2007 and all converted to N700-2000 series "N700A" by August 2015
 N700-1000 series "N700A": 16-car "G" sets owned by JR Central, introduced from 8 February 2013
 N700-2000 series "N700A": 81 x 16-car "X" sets owned by JR Central, modified from original "Z" sets between 2013 and 2015
 N700-3000 series: 16 x 16-car "N" sets owned by JR-West, introduced from 1 July 2007
 N700-4000 series "N700A": 16-car "F" sets owned by JR-West, introduced from December 2013
 N700-5000 series "N700A": 16-car "K" sets owned by JR-West, modified from original "N" sets from October 2013
 N700-7000 series: 19 x 8-car "S" sets owned by JR-West, introduced from 12 March 2011
 N700-8000 series: 11 x 8-car "R" sets owned by JR Kyushu, introduced from 12 March 2011
 N700-9000 series: Prototype 16-car set Z0 owned by JR Central, later renumbered X0 and retired in 2019

16-car G sets (N700-1000 series "N700A")

The N700-1000 series, or "N700A" (with "A" standing for "Advanced"), is a new version of the N700 series design delivered from August 2012, and entering revenue service from 8 February 2013.

The new version is externally identical to the existing N700 series sets, with the addition of new "N700A" logos on each odd-numbered car. The new trains include modified brake discs, bogie vibration detection, and ATC improvements.

Six "G" sets were scheduled to be introduced during fiscal 2012, replacing older 700 series sets, with seven more sets introduced during fiscal 2013. A further 18 sets are on order by JR Central, to be delivered six sets per year between fiscal 2014 and 2016 at a cost of 88 billion yen. In October 2015, JR Central announced that it had ordered a further 20 N700A series sets to be delivered between fiscal 2016 and 2019, replacing all of the remaining 700 series trains sets on Tokaido Shinkansen services.

The first set, G1, was delivered to Hamamatsu in August 2012, with test running commencing on the Tokaido Shinkansen the following month.

Formation
The 16-car G sets are formed as follows, with car 1 at the Shin-Osaka (western) end and car 16 at the Tokyo (eastern) end.

Cars 5 and 12 each have one single-arm pantograph.

Interior
Internally, seats have new moquette seat covers, and LED lighting is used in toilets and washing areas.

Fleet list
, the N700A series G set fleet is as follows.

16-car X sets (N700-2000 series "N700A")

 81 x 16-car sets, X0–X80 (converted from N700-0 series)
These are former N700 series Z sets modified between 2013 and August 2015 to incorporate some of the design improvements featured in the later N700A series sets. Cars are renumbered in the -2000 subseries, with the exception of set X0, which is still numbered in the -9000 subseries. The sets are also identified by the addition of a small "A" added to the right of the bodyside "N700" logos.
The prototype 16-car train (Z0) was delivered in March 2005 for extensive testing and endurance running. Cars 1 to 4 were built by Hitachi, cars 5 to 14 were built by Nippon Sharyo, and cars 15 and 16 were built by Kawasaki Heavy Industries. It was initially fitted with two auxiliary headlights located below the nose.

The first full-production Z set (Z1) was delivered to JR Central in April 2007, and trains entered revenue service on 1 July 2007, with eight daily Nozomi service runs. The final Z set, Z80, was delivered from Kawasaki Heavy Industries in February 2012.

From fiscal 2013, the fleet of Z sets underwent modifications to incorporate some of the improvements featured in the later N700A series sets. Modified sets were re-designated "X" sets, with cars renumbered in the -2000 subseries. The modified sets are also identified by the addition of a small "A" added to the right of the bodyside "N700" logos. The first original "Z" set, set Z65, was modified to become set X65 in May 2013, with the last original "Z" set, set Z4, modified to become set X4 in August 2015.

The prototype set Z0 was used as a JR Central test train with cars numbered in the -9000 series, and was not used in revenue service. It was renumbered set X0 in 2014, but the car numbers remained in the -9000 subseries. The set was officially withdrawn from service in February 2019.

Withdrawals of N700 series X sets commenced in July 2020, beginning with set X12.

Former Z sets

Formation
The 16-car X sets are formed as follows.

Former Z set formation

Cars 5 and 12 each have one single-arm pantograph.

Interior

Fleet list
, the JR Central N700A series fleet is as follows.

16-car F sets (N700-4000 series "N700A")

These are N700A series sets owned by JR-West and classified N700-4000 series, with one set (set F1) delivered in November 2013 and entering revenue service from 8 February 2014. A further four sets were delivered each in fiscal 2015 (sets F2 to F5) and fiscal 2016 (sets F6 to F9), followed by three in fiscal 2017 (sets F10 to F12), five in fiscal 2018 (sets F13 to F17), and seven in fiscal 2019 (sets F18 to F24).

Formation
The 16-car F sets are formed as follows.

Fleet list
, the JR-West N700A series fleet is as follows.

16-car K sets (N700-5000 series "N700A")
16 x 16-car sets, K1–K16 (Converted from N700-3000 series) 

These are JR-West trainsets modified from October 2013 from former N700 series N sets to incorporate some of the design improvements featured in the later N700A series sets.

Former N sets
The 16-car N sets were operated by JR-West on Tokaido and Sanyo Shinkansen services. The first set, N1, was delivered in June 2007, entering service on 1 July 2007. 16 sets were in service by April 2014.

The fleet of 16 "N" sets subsequently underwent modifications at Hakata Depot between fiscal 2013 and fiscal 2015 to add improved braking systems and other features incorporated in the later N700A series sets. Modified sets were re-designated "K" sets, with cars renumbered in the -5000 subseries.

Formation
The 16-car K sets are formed as follows.

Former N set formation
The 16-car N sets were formed as follows.

Cars 5 and 12 each have one single-arm pantograph.

Fleet list
, the JR-West N700A series fleet is as follows.

8-car S sets (N700-7000 series)

 19 x 8-car sets, S1–S19
The pre-series set (S1) was delivered to Hakata Depot in October 2008. These trains do not feature the tilting mechanism of the earlier N700 trains, as they do not run on the Tokaido Shinkansen.

External livery is  pale blue intended to evoke the colour of traditional porcelain with indigo and gold bodyside lining.

Full-production JR-West sets were delivered to Hakata Depot from early April 2010. The final S set, S19, was delivered to Hakata Depot in February 2012.

Formation
The 8-car S sets, S1–S19, are formed as follows.

Cars 2 and 7 each have one single-arm pantograph.

Interior
Cars 4 to 8 (including half of car 6) are designated as "reserved seating" cars with 2+2 abreast configuration, 465 mm wide seats and a seat pitch of 1,040 mm. Cars 1 to 3 are "non-reserved seating" cars with 2+3 abreast configuration, 440 mm wide seats (460 mm in middle of 3-seat row) and a seat pitch of 1,040 mm.

Fleet list
, the fleet consists of 19 sets, all based at Hakata Shinkansen Depot.

8-car R sets (N700-8000 series)

 11 x 8-car sets, R1–R11
These are eleven 8-car N700 series sets operated by JR Kyushu alongside JR-West N700-7000 series "S" sets on through-running Sakura and Mizuho services between Shin-Osaka and Kagoshima-Chūō on the Kyushu Shinkansen since 12 March 2011. External livery is identical to the N700-7000 series "S" sets.

The first set, R1, was delivered to Kumamoto Depot in July 2010. Test running on the unopened section of the Kyushu Shinkansen began on 31 August 2010.

Formation
The 8-car R sets are formed as follows.

Cars 2 and 7 each have one single-arm pantograph.

Interior
As with the JR-West N700-7000 series sets, the R sets feature a Green car saloon in half of one car (car 6) consisting of 24 seats (6 rows) arranged in 2+2 abreast configuration. Cars 4 to 8 (including half of car 6) are designated as "reserved seating" cars with 2+2 abreast configuration. Cars 1 to 3 are "non-reserved seating" cars with 2+3 abreast configuration.

Fleet list
, the fleet consists of 11 sets, all based at Kumamoto Shinkansen Depot.

N700-I Bullet
This was a proposed export version of the N700 series design announced by JR Central Chairman Yoshiyuki Kasai at an international high-speed railway symposium held in Nagoya on 16 November 2009. Nominally specified as an 8-car set with a maximum operating speed of 330 km/h (205 mph), the train can be configured in lengths from 6 to 16 cars to suit customer requirements.

The same model was being considered in the developing Houston–Dallas Texas Central Railway, before focus shifted to the N700S due to its inherently modular construction, and higher top speed.

High-speed trials
The high-speed run was conducted as a demonstration for approximately 160 international guests attending a high-speed railway symposium in Nagoya.

Incidents

Fire damage and replacement
Car 783-2059 (car 1) of JR Central set X59 was scrapped due to fire damage sustained in an arson attack occurring on 30 June 2015. A replacement car with the same running number was built by Nippon Sharyo in 2016.

Discovery of cracked bogie
On 11 December 2017, Car 785-5505 (car 13) of JR West set K5 (a 16-car N700A built by Kawasaki Heavy Industries) was taken out of service at Nagoya Station after engineers confirmed an unusual burning smell. The smell was detected at Kokura Station, but was ordered by the operational centre to continue service until Nagoya which JR West later admitted was a "big danger". An on-site inspection revealed that the outer frame of the carriage had cracked and its underfloor carriage was leaking oil. It was the first "serious incident" involving any Shinkansen, and Ministry of Land, Infrastructure, Transport and Tourism reported that the train could have derailed had it continued on service and the carriage frame broke. An investigation by JR West implicated companies involved in the construction of the trainset, which included Kawasaki Heavy Industries, Nippon Steel and Mitsubishi Electric. The investigation revealed that at least 100 out of the 303 Kawasaki-made bogies were substandard due to improper welding preparations, which caused the base material of the bogies to become 4.7mm in thickness, instead of the required 7mm or more. Following the events JR West is planning to gradually replace all the bogies that were provided by Kawasaki.

Overall fleet history
The annual totals for the fleet sizes (number of vehicles as of 1 April each year) owned by JR Central, JR West, and JR Kyushu are as follows.

Preserved examples

On display at the SCMaglev and Railway Park, Nagoya, from 17 July 2019:
 783-9001 (ex-prototype set X0, built 2005 by Hitachi)
 775-9001 (ex-prototype set X0, built 2005 by Nippon Sharyo)
 786-9201 (ex-prototype set X0, built 2005 by Nippon Sharyo)

See also
 List of high-speed trains

References

External links

 JR Central N700 series 
 JR-West N700 series Nozomi 

Central Japan Railway Company
West Japan Railway Company
Kyushu Railway Company
Shinkansen train series
Hitachi multiple units
Tilting trains
Train-related introductions in 2007
Passenger trains running at least at 300 km/h in commercial operations
25 kV AC multiple units
Electric multiple units of Japan
Kawasaki multiple units
Kinki Sharyo multiple units
Nippon Sharyo multiple units